Christ Church West is a constituency in the Christ Church area of Barbados represented in the House of Assembly of the Barbadian Parliament since 2013 by Maria Agard MP of the BLP.

N.B. Ms. Agard has been expelled from the BLP, as of 2015. As such, she now sits as an independent Member of Parliament. She is the only sitting MP to have been expelled from her party.

Since its founding in 1971 this constituency has been chiefly held by the BLP.

Boundaries 
From a point on the southern sea coast south of the junction of the Highway 7 (Hastings-Top Rock Road) with Rendezvous Hill in a straight line to Highway 7; thence in a northerly direction along Rendezvous Hill to its junction with Rendezvous Ridge, then in an easterly direction to the eastern boundary of Rendezvous Ridge Development, then in a northerly direction to the ABC Highway, thence across the ABC Highway to a point south of the western boundary of Tino Terrace (at Lot #29); thence in a northerly direction along the western boundary of Tino Terrace and Warners Gardens (Lot #53); thence in an easterly direction along Warners Gardens northern boundary to a point where it meets the southern terminus of Brownes Road (at Lot #76) thence in northerly direction along the Brownes Road-Sargeants Village Tenantry Road to the junction with Highway 6 (the Sargeants Village Road); thence in a westerly direction along the middle of the Sargeants Village Road to its junction with the Errol Barrow Highway at the Garfield Sobers Round-a-bout; thence in a westerly direction along the middle of the Errol Barrow Highway to its junction with Highway 6 (Collymore Rock-Sargeants Village Road); thence in a westerly direction along the middle of Highway 6 to its junction with Clapham Park Road thence along the middle of the Clapham Park Road to its junction with Clapham Road; thence in a westerly direction along the middle of Clapham Road to its junction with Observatory Road; thence in a south westerly direction along the middle of Observatory Road to its junction with Fordes Road; thence in a westerly direction, along the middle of Fordes Road to its junction with Brittons New Road; thence ip a westerly direction along the middle of Brittons New Road to its junction with Reservoir Road; thence in a southerly direction along the middle of Reservoir Road to the Ridge and using an imaginary line continue over and beyond the Ridge to the 1st Ave Dayrell's Road; thence southerly along the middle of 1st Avenue Dayrells Road to its junction with Dayrells Road; thence in a westerly direction along the middle of Dayrells Road to its junction with the Garrison Road; thence in a south westerly direction along the middle of the Garrison Road to its junction with Highway 7; then directly across Highway 7 and continuing in a south westerly direction along the road leading to Gravesend Beach and directly to the sea; thence in an easterly direction along the sea coast to a point on the coast south of the junction of Rendezvous Hill with Highway 7 the starting point).

History

Members of Parliament

Notes

References 

Constituencies of the Parliament of Barbados
Christ Church, Barbados
1971 establishments in Barbados
Constituencies established in 1971